The Pemberton-Billing P.B.25 was a First World War British single-seat scout aircraft built by Pemberton-Billing Limited, later Supermarine Aviation Works Limited.

Design and development 
The P.B.23 was designed in 1915 as a single-seat biplane scout, with a fuselage nacelle strut-mounted between the wings.  The nacelle had an open cockpit for the pilot at the front and at the rear an 80 hp (60 kW) Le Rhône 9C engine driving a pusher propeller. Twin fins and rudders were mounted on a wide-span tailplane with an elevator attached, all connected to the wing structure with four tailbooms. The P.B.23 failed to gain an order after it first flew in September 1915, but twenty of an improved version, the P.B.25, were ordered by the Royal Naval Air Service.  The P.B.25 had swept-back wings, a modified landing gear and a revised fuselage nacelle and although originally powered by a 110 hp (82 kW) Clerget rotary engine, the 20 RNAS aircraft were fitted with Gnome Monosoupape 9 Type B-2 rotary piston engines.

Operational history 
The aircraft, which were not used operationally, were based at RNAS Hornchurch and RNAS Hendon, where they were probably used in the training role.

Operators 

 Royal Naval Air Service

Specifications (P.B.25)

See also

References

Further reading

1910s British military reconnaissance aircraft
Supermarine aircraft
Single-engined pusher aircraft
Biplanes
Aircraft first flown in 1915
Rotary-engined aircraft